Isaie Louis (born January 18, 2005) is an American professional soccer player who plays as a forward for League of Ireland First Division club Athlone Town.

Career

Youth
Louis joined the New England Revolution academy in 2019 from Valeo FC.

In 2020, Louis spent time with the club's USL League One affiliate team New England Revolution II. He made his debut on September 9, 2020, appearing as an 87th-minute substitute during a 2–1 loss to Chattanooga Red Wolves.

References

2005 births
American soccer players
Association football forwards
Virginia Cavaliers men's soccer players
Living people
Soccer players from Massachusetts
New England Revolution II players
USL League One players
People from Everett, Massachusetts
Athlone Town A.F.C. players
League of Ireland players
Expatriate association footballers in the Republic of Ireland